The men's moguls competition of the FIS Freestyle World Ski Championships 2013 was held at Myrkdalen-Voss, Norway on March 5 (qualifying)  and March 6 (finals). 
51 athletes from 18 countries competed.

Results

Qualification
The following are the results of the qualification.

Final
The following are the results of the final.

References

Moguls, men's